"Teardrops" is a song by British rock band Bring Me the Horizon. Produced by the band's vocalist Oliver Sykes and keyboardist Jordan Fish, it was released as the fourth single from the group's 2020 commercial release Post Human: Survival Horror on 22 October 2020.

Promotion and release
After an announcement regarding information for a September 2021 UK arena tour was released, the band revealed a teaser for the new music video for "Teardrops" that would be dropped the following day.

Composition and lyrics

"Teardrops" has been described by critics as a nu metal, metalcore, hard rock, alternative rock, and an emo song. It was written by the band's lead vocalist Oliver Sykes and keyboardist Jordan Fish. The song talks about kids growing up in today's age with tech addiction being commonplace and the problems of it. It also talks about depression and anxiety. The music video represents Sykes struggles with his mental health and drug abuse, but he overpassed it because of his bandmates. According to an interview with NME, the song is Oliver Sykes' personal favourite on Post Human: Survival Horror. During the production of "Teardrops", Sykes tried to convince Jordan Fish to incorporate elephant trumpet noises into the song. Initially done as a joke, Sykes and Fish opted to sneak the sound into the song and heavily pitched and played with the reverb to disguise the obvious noises to fit in with the rest of the song, it first notably happens at around 10 seconds into the song. 

Musically, "Teardrops" sets inspiration from the typical nu-metal genre and the song is compared by music critics mostly to old Linkin Park's sound. It was also noted that the chord progression of "Teardrops" took inspiration from the aforementioned band's "Somewhere I Belong" on Linkin Park's Meteora that was released in 2003. Speaking about the song overall, Sykes explains his thoughts on "Teardrops" at the time of release:

Additionally, Sykes would explain his thought process on the meaning behind "Teardrops" in an interview with BBC Radio 1:

Commercial performance
Following "Parasite Eve" and "Obey", "Teardrops" would continue the trend  set by the formers by debuting in the UK Singles Chart within the Top 40, debuting and peaking at number 39. The song would also debut on the Scottish Singles Chart for a solitary week at number 62. The song would simultaneously debut and peak on the UK Singles Sales, UK Downloads and the UK Streaming charts at 46, 45, and 77 respectively.

Post Human: Survival Horror was released on 30 October, which would help keep "Teardrops" steadily in the Top 100 for the following two weeks, 49 and 90, before dropping out of the charts completely on 20 November 2020. Simultaneously, "Teardrops" would debut atop the UK Rock & Metal Singles Chart and stay top of the charts for two weeks. It would chart for nine consecutive weeks, before dropping out on 1  January 2021, before re-entering the following week at number 38 on 8 January 2021 after all the Christmas songs dropped off the charts. It would bumble in and out of the Top 40 in January and the beginning of February, spending a combined total of 12 non-consecutive weeks on the UK Rock & Metal Singles chart before dropping out completely on 12 February 2021.

In the US, "Teardrops" sold 3000 digital downloads and also racked up 1.9 million streams within its first week. This resulted in the song debuting and peaking at number 44 on the Digital Song Sales chart, number 16 on the Hot Rock & Alternative Songs chart and debuted atop the newly introduced Hot Hard Rock Songs chart by Billboard.

Music video
The music video for "Teardrops" was released on the same day as the single. Directed by Sykes himself, the video takes inspirations from his battle with depression during the lockdown period, in which this would be represented in the scenes with him drowning.

The video would start off with Sykes sitting on a bed, before sinking into the bed into an ocean of water, in which he would sing as he's drowning. This would be shown in between cuts of him sinking into a bathtub and going crazy. It would later be shown that a figure was the one drowning Sykes into the water and creeping over him while he's sleeping in bed. Eventually, Sykes is pulled up out of the water by the helping hand of Jordan Fish and then joins the rest of his bandmates for the rest of the song.

In popular culture
 A heavily censored radio edit of "Teardrops" was included in the video game soundtrack for the Xbox exclusive Forza Horizon 5.

Charts

Weekly charts

Year-end charts

Certifications

References

2020 singles
2020 songs
Bring Me the Horizon songs
Songs written by Oliver Sykes
RCA Records singles
Sony Music singles
Nu metal songs
Emo songs